Calothamnus blepharospermus is a plant in the myrtle family, Myrtaceae and is endemic to the west coast of Western Australia. It is an upright, spreading, bushy shrub with red flowers in summer. It grows in sandy soil in scrubby country called kwongan. (In 2014 Craven, Edwards and Cowley proposed that the species be renamed Melaleuca blepharosperma.)

Description

Taxonomy and naming
Calothamnus blepharospermus was first formally described in 1862 by Ferdinand von Mueller from a specimen found "in desert near the Murchison River by Oldfield". The specific epithet blepharospermus is derived from the Greek words blepharon meaning "eyelid" and sperma, spermatos meaning "seed".

Distribution and habitat
Calothamnus blepharospermus occurs in the Geraldton Sandplains, Yalgoo biogeographic regions where it grows in sand or sandy clay on plains and sand dunes.

Conservation status
Calothamnus blepharospermus is classified as "not threatened" by the Western Australian Government Department of Parks and Wildlife.

References

blepharospermus
Myrtales of Australia
Plants described in 1862
Endemic flora of Western Australia
Taxa named by Ferdinand von Mueller